Thomas or Tom Gorman may refer to:
 Thomas Kiely Gorman (1892–1980), Roman Catholic bishop of Dallas
 Tom Gorman (American football) (1910–1975), American football player and coach
 Tom Gorman (rugby league) (1901–1978), Australian rugby league player
 Tom Gorman (tennis) (born 1946), American tennis player
 Tommie Gorman (born 1956), Irish journalist
 Tommy Gorman (1886–1961), Canadian lacrosse player and founder of the National Hockey League (NHL)

Baseball
 Tom Gorman (1980s pitcher) (born 1957), American baseball relief pitcher
 Tom Gorman (right-handed pitcher) (1925–1992), American baseball relief pitcher
 Tom Gorman (umpire) (1919–1986), American baseball pitcher and umpire

See also
 Gorman Thomas (born 1950), American former professional baseball player